Mantas Fridrikas (born 13 September 1988) is a Lithuanian footballer who plays for FC Hegelmann Litauen as a centre back.

Career
Fridrikas made eight appearances and scored one goal for FBK Kaunas during the 2007 season.

Fridrikas was hoping to move to Scottish Premier League side Heart of Midlothian in January 2009.

Later plays for FC Fyn as a defender.

From 2017 he played in FK Atlantas Klaipėda.

From 2018 summer in FK Panevėžys.

Personal life
Fridrikas' father Robertas and his half-brother Lukas are also professional footballers.

References

Living people
1988 births
Lithuanian footballers
Association football defenders
FBK Kaunas footballers
FC Šiauliai players
FK Žalgiris players
FK Utenis Utena players
FK Kauno Žalgiris players
FC Fyn players
FK Atlantas players
FK Panevėžys players
FC Hegelmann players
A Lyga players
Danish 1st Division players
Lithuania international footballers
Lithuanian expatriate footballers
Expatriate men's footballers in Denmark
Lithuanian expatriate sportspeople in Denmark